Roscioli is a surname. Notable people with the surname include:

Dee Roscioli (born 1977), American singer and actress
Fabio Roscioli (born 1965), Italian cyclist